Those marked in bold have later been capped at full International level.

Group A

Head coach:

Head coach:

Head coach:

Head coach:

Group B

Head coach:

Head coach:

Head coach:

Head coach:Juan Santisteban

Group C

Head coach:

Head coach:

Head coach:

Head coach:

Group D

Head coach:

Head coach:

Head coach:

Head coach:

Footnotes

UEFA European Under-17 Championship squads